Gagetown-Petitcodiac is a provincial electoral district for the Legislative Assembly of New Brunswick, Canada.  It was first contested in the 2014 general election, having been created in the 2013 redistribution of electoral boundaries.

The district runs from boundaries of the town of Oromocto to those of the city of Moncton along New Brunswick Highway 2, and includes only small municipalities and unincorporated communities.  It drew significant population the former districts of Petitcodiac, Grand Lake-Gagetown, Oromocto, Kings East and Hampton-Kings.

Members of the Legislative Assembly

Election results

References

External links 
Website of the Legislative Assembly of New Brunswick
Map of riding as of 2018

New Brunswick provincial electoral districts